Evelyn Grace Hartley (born  November 21, 1938) was an American teenager who mysteriously disappeared on October 24, 1953, from La Crosse, Wisconsin. Her disappearance sparked a search involving 2,000 people. In the first year following her disappearance, investigators questioned more than 3,500 people. , no trace of her has ever been found.

Disappearance 
On October 24, 1953, Viggo Rasmussen, a professor at La Crosse State College (now University of Wisconsin–La Crosse), hired Evelyn Hartley, the daughter of a fellow professor, to take care of his 20-month old daughter. That evening, Evelyn's father Richard called the Rasmussen house several times after she failed to check in as planned at 8:30 PM; he received no answer. Concerned, he drove to the Rasmussen house. When Richard arrived, the doors were locked, the lights and radio were on, and items were scattered all over the house. The living room furniture had been moved around to different places, as were Evelyn's school books. Richard found her shoes in different rooms, one shoe upstairs, and one downstairs. He also found his daughter's broken glasses upstairs. Richard did not find Evelyn in the house.

Richard also found every room in the house locked, except one in the basement that was located at the back of the house. An opened window there was missing a screen, and the screen was found leaning against an outside wall. He also found a short stepladder belonging to the homeowner positioned at the opened window. Pry marks were found on some windows, and footprints had been found in areas of the house. Blood was found both inside the house and in the yard, with bloody hand prints about 100 feet away in a garage and in a nearby house. The child Evelyn had been caring for was found asleep and unharmed.

Investigation 
Police believe someone took Evelyn through the yard, but dropped her on the ground before carrying her further. The police used dogs to pick up her scent trail, which ended at Coulee Drive two blocks away. Police thought Evelyn was most likely put into a vehicle there and driven away. They were told by one neighbor they had seen a car repeatedly driving around the neighborhood, and another person who lived nearby claimed they had heard screams an hour earlier. The witness thought it was just children playing. Two days after the incident, local resident Ed Hofer told police that while driving his vehicle, he was almost hit by a dark green two-tone 1942 Buick as it was speeding in a westerly direction. Inside the Buick, Hofer reported seeing one man was driving the vehicle while a second man was in the backseat with a girl. Hofer also reported that a few minutes earlier, he had seen the same two men with the young girl as he was pulling outside his brother-in-law's house located around the corner from the Rasmussen house. Hofer had stated that the girl was wedged between the two men and had thought that she was drunk as the two men were holding her by her arms as they were walking down the street.    

Several days later, various items of clothing, many of which were stained with blood, were found at different locations. Blood found on the jacket matched Evelyn's blood type.

Over 1,000 members of the local community, including law enforcement officers, the National Guard, Boy Scouts, and La Crosse State College students and faculty, participated in a search in October 1953. The Civil Air Patrol and U.S. Air Force were also used in the search. A vehicle inspection program was also undertaken with the intent of searching every vehicle in La Crosse County. Gas station attendants were asked to check cars for blood stains. Recent graves were reopened to determine if Evelyn's remains were placed with a recent burial.

In May 1954, mass lie detector tests were conducted on La Crosse-area high school boys in an attempt to find more information about Evelyn's disappearance. Though local authorities had planned to test 1,750 students and faculty, the testing was controversial and was halted after around 300 were tested.

After his arrest, murderer Ed Gein was considered a suspect in Evelyn's disappearance, as he was visiting a relative a few blocks away from the Rasmussen house at the time. However, Gein denied involvement in the disappearance and passed two lie detector tests; police found no trace of Evelyn's remains during a search of Gein's Plainfield property. In November 1957, authorities announced that Gein had been cleared of any connection with the disappearances of both Evelyn and Georgia Weckler, an 8-year-old who disappeared in 1947. Despite this, some still consider Gein a suspect.

Aftermath 
Evelyn's kidnapping led to one of the biggest searches in the history of Wisconsin. Public efforts to find her have included the Charley Project and the Soddy-Daisy-Roots Project. A reward fund established in the immediate aftermath of the event reached $6,600 (equivalent to $ in ). Her parents moved to Portland, Oregon, in the 1970s, and are now both deceased.

Later developments 
In 2004, a man named Mel Williams came forward with a conversation he recorded at a bar in 1969. Although his goal was to record a band which was performing, the conversation between two men was unintentionally recorded as well. On the tape, one of the men, Clyde "Tywee" Peterson, implicated himself, Jack Gaulphair (or Gaulthair), and an unnamed third party in the disappearance, claiming that Evelyn was murdered and buried in La Farge, Wisconsin, after her kidnapping. Gaulphair and the unnamed party are now deceased, Gaulphair having committed suicide on 25 December 1967, and Peterson having died of a heart attack in 1974. Although authorities promised to investigate the lead, no further developments were ever made.

In 2016, her case was profiled on an episode of The Vanished.

On September 24, 2022, Evelyn Hartley's disappearance was featured as Case 224 of the CaseFile podcast.

See also 
List of kidnappings
List of people who disappeared

References

Further reading 

https://worldcat.org/title/61690167 Where's Evelyn? : the 1953 babysitter's kidnapping that shook the nation Author: Susan T. Hessel Publisher: Lessons from Life, La Crosse, WI, ©2005

1950s missing person cases
1953 in Wisconsin
Articles containing video clips
Kidnapped American children
Missing American children
Missing person cases in Wisconsin
People declared dead in absentia
People from La Crosse County, Wisconsin
History of women in Wisconsin
Incidents of violence against girls